is a Japanese shōjo manga series written and illustrated by Kazuko Fujita. It was serialized in Shogakukan's manga magazine Shōjo Comic from 1987 to 1989. Shogakukan collected the manga into seven volumes under its Flower Comics label from January 1988 to July 1989. It was adapted into the Taiwanese drama Momo Love in 2009.

References 

Manga series
1987 manga
Shōjo manga
Shogakukan manga
1989 comics endings
Manga adapted into television series